Devon Dimitri Grousis-Henderson (born November 7, 1987) is a retired American soccer player.

Career

College and amateur
Devon is a product of the Junior College system, spending three years at Fresno City College. After being recruited by a number of schools including UCSB, SFSU, Chico State, USF, and Stanislaus Univ, he settled on Fresno Pacific University in his home town, where he played his 2009 junior year. During his sophomore year at FCC, after a successful trial, he was signed with his home town USL Premier Development League side, Fresno Fuego, where he started as a reserve. Devon moved his way up to be one of the instrumental players in the team's 2011 undefeated regular season run.

Professional
Devon spent the 2012 pre-season with Major League Soccer side San Jose Earthquakes. After being released, he was brought in by Mark Steffans of the Charlotte Eagles, where he spent his first month largely as a reserve squad player. After the team's 0-4-1 start to the season, where they had an average 3 goals per game, he was assigned to first team action. In his first professional game, the team took a 2-1 victory on the road to Harrisburg City Islanders. From the point of his signing on, the team went on to claim a 14-7-2 record, averaging under a goal against per game, and finishing second best in the league for goals scored against.

In late October 2012, he was signed by Phoenix FC for an undisclosed amount.

External links
 Eagles profile
 Press Release of PFC signing
 Phoenix FC Roster
 Story of Phoenix FC's signing of Devon Grousis

1987 births
Living people
American soccer players
Fresno Fuego players
Charlotte Eagles players
Phoenix FC players
Phoenix Rising FC players
USL League Two players
USL Championship players
Fresno City College alumni
Soccer players from California
Association football defenders